Vincent Patrick Lester  (born 28 July 1939) is an Australian politician. He was a National Party member of the Legislative Assembly of Queensland from 1974 to 2004, representing in succession the electorates of Belyando, Peak Downs and then Keppel. He served as a minister in several National Party governments throughout his career, having first been promoted in 1983 as part of Sir Joh Bjelke-Petersen's cabinet.

Following his retirement from parliament Lester was employed as a political advisor on the staff of Senator Ron Boswell, a senator for Queensland.

Lester received a Centenary Medal on 1 January 2001 for "service to Australian society through parliament". He was awarded the Medal of the Order of Australia (OAM) in the 2006 Australia Day Honours for "service to the community through the Queensland Parliament and to local government".

References

1939 births
Living people
National Party of Australia members of the Parliament of Queensland
Members of the Queensland Legislative Assembly
21st-century Australian politicians
Recipients of the Medal of the Order of Australia